William Brown Read (December 14, 1817 – August 5, 1880) was a 19th-century politician and lawyer from Kentucky.

Born in Hardin County, Kentucky, Read completed preparatory studies, studied law and was admitted to the bar, commencing practice in Hodgenville, Kentucky in 1849. He was a member of the Kentucky Senate from 1857 to 1865, was a delegate to both of the Democratic National Conventions in 1860 and was an unsuccessful candidate for Lieutenant Governor of Kentucky in 1863, losing to Richard T. Jacob. Read was again a delegate to the Democratic National Convention in 1864, was a member of the Kentucky House of Representatives from 1867 to 1869 and was elected a Democrat to the United States House of Representatives in 1870, serving from 1871 to 1875, being unsuccessful for renomination in 1874. Afterwards, he resumed practicing law until his death in Hodgenville, Kentucky on August 5, 1880. He was interred in Red Hill Cemetery in Hodgenville.

External links

1817 births
1880 deaths
Democratic Party members of the Kentucky House of Representatives
Democratic Party Kentucky state senators
Kentucky lawyers
People of Kentucky in the American Civil War
People from Hardin County, Kentucky
People from Hodgenville, Kentucky
Democratic Party members of the United States House of Representatives from Kentucky
19th-century American politicians
19th-century American lawyers